Hamoir is a municipality of Wallonia located in the province of Liège, Belgium.

On 1 January 2006, Hamoir had a total population of 3,592. The total area is 27.80 km2 which gives a population density of 129 inhabitants per km2. Hamoir is situated on the river Ourthe.

The municipality consists of the following districts: Comblain-Fairon, Filot, and Hamoir.

See also
 List of protected heritage sites in Hamoir

References

External links
 

 
Municipalities of Liège Province
Segni (tribe)